The Sabah flying gecko (Gekko rhacophorus) is a species of gecko. It is endemic to Sabah.

References 

Gekko
Reptiles described in 1899